Charles Francis Riffle (January 6, 1918 – February 28, 2002) was an American football guard.

Riffle was born in Ohio in 1918 and attended Warren G. Harding High School in Warren, Ohio. He played college football at Notre Dame.  During World War II, he served in the United States Navy.

Riffle played for the Cleveland Rams in the National Football League in 1944 and for the New York Yankees of the All-America Football Conference from 1946 to 1948. He appeared in 50 games for the Rams and Yankees.

He died in 2002 in Sun City West, Arizona.

References

1918 births
2002 deaths
American football guards
Cleveland Rams players
New York Yankees (AAFC) players
Notre Dame Fighting Irish football players
Players of American football from Ohio
United States Navy personnel of World War II